The United States competed at the 1948 Summer Olympics in London, England. 300 competitors, 262 men and 38 women, took part in 126 events in 19 sports.

Medalists

Athletics

Basketball

Boxing

Canoeing

Cycling

Nine cyclists represented the United States in 1948.

Individual road race
 Frank Brilando
 Ed Lynch
 Chester Nelsen
 Wendell Rollins

Team road race
 Frank Brilando
 Ed Lynch
 Chester Nelsen
 Wendell Rollins

Sprint
 Jack Heid

Time trial
 Jack Heid

Tandem
 Marvin Thomson
 Al Stiller

Team pursuit
 Al Stiller
 Thomas Montemage
 Ted Smith

Diving

Equestrian

Fencing

20 fencers represented the United States in 1948.

Men's foil
 Dean Cetrulo
 Silvio Giolito
 Nathaniel Lubell

Men's team foil
 Daniel Bukantz, Dean Cetrulo, Dernell Every, Silvio Giolito, Nate Lubell, Austin Prokop

Men's épée
 Norman Lewis
 Joe de Capriles
 Albert Wolff

Men's team épée
 Norman Lewis, Andrew Boyd, Joe de Capriles, Donald Thompson, Albert Wolff, Ralph Goldstein

Men's sabre
 George Worth
 Tibor Nyilas
 Dean Cetrulo

Men's team sabre
 Norman Cohn-Armitage, George Worth, Tibor Nyilas, Dean Cetrulo, Miguel de Capriles, James Flynn

Women's foil
 Maria Cerra
 Jan York-Romary
 Helena Dow

Football

Results
U.S. 0-9 Italy

Roster
 Robert Annis
 Walter Bahr
 Raymond Beckman
 Bill Bertani
 Charlie Colombo
 Joe Ferreira
 Steve Grivnow
 Manuel Martin
 Benny McLaughlin
 Gino Pariani
 Joseph Rego-Costa
 Archie Strimel
 Ed Souza
 John Souza
 Rolf Valtin

Gymnastics

Hockey

Head coach: Henry Goode as playing manager and Kurt Orban as playing coach

Felix Ucko played in every match a different position.

Modern pentathlon

Three pentathletes represented the United States in 1948.

 George Moore
 Richard Gruenther
 Hale Baugh

Rowing

The United States had 26 rowers participate in all seven rowing events in 1948.

 Men's single sculls
 John B. Kelly Jr.

 Men's double sculls
 Joe Angyal
 Arthur Gallagher

 Men's coxless pair
 John Wade
 Ralph Stephan

 Men's coxed pair
 Vincent Deeney
 Joseph Toland
 John McIntyre (cox)

 Men's coxless four
 Fred Kingsbury
 Stu Griffing
 Greg Gates
 Robert Perew

 Men's coxed four
 Warren Westlund
 Bob Martin
 Bob Will
 Gordy Giovanelli
 Allen Morgan (cox)

 Men's eight
 Ian Turner
 David Turner
 James Hardy
 George Ahlgren
 Lloyd Butler
 David Brown
 Justus Smith
 John Stack
 Ralph Purchase (cox)

Sailing

Shooting

Twelve shooters represented the United States in 1948. In the 50 metre rifle event Art Cook won gold and Walter Tomsen won silver.

25 metre pistol
 Bob Chow
 Philip Roettinger
 John Layton

50 metre pistol
 Joe Benner
 Walter Walsh
 Quentin Brooks

300 metre rifle
 Emmett Swanson
 Art Jackson
 Frank Parsons, Jr.

50 metre rifle
 Art Cook
 Walter Tomsen
 Harry Cail

Swimming

Water polo

Weightlifting

Wrestling

References

Nations at the 1948 Summer Olympics
1948
Olympics